Dato’ Seri Dr. Awang Adek bin Hussin (born 18 May 1956) is a Malaysian politician and diplomat. He is the former Malaysian Ambassador to the United States. He was the Member of the Parliament of Malaysia for the Bachok constituency in Kelantan for one term from 2004 to 2008. Datuk Dr. Awang Adek bin Hussin is no longer an active politician he once was. He had relinquished all his party positions after the General Election in 2018. He remains active as an ordinary party member and is no longer active in party politics. Since 2018, his involvements focused mainly on corporate activities and has been chairmen on a few boards.

Early life and education
Awang Adek was born in Bachok, Kelantan. Awang Adek holds degrees in mathematics and economics from Drew University of the United States and a Doctor of Philosophy (PhD) and master's degree from Wharton School of the University of Pennsylvania.

Career
He began his career as a lecturer at Universiti Sains Malaysia (USM) from 1983 to 1985.

Later, he joined Bank Negara Malaysia (BNM) from 1985 to 2001 with the last post as assistant governor.

He also served as Chairman Tenaga Nasional Berhad (TNB) besides being loaned to Labuan Offshore Financial Services Authority as the first Director-General for two years beginning in 1996.

Involvement in politics
Awang Adek became active in politics when he was elected as Deputy UMNO leader for Bachok in 2001.

He has also been given the mandate to hold the UMNO Kelantan Treasurer post since 2003. In 2003, he was also appointed as UMNO Sponsor Chairman for Bachok and was unopposed in the election of the division this year.

He stood for the Bachok Parliamentary seat election in 2004, and after winning the seat, he was appointed Deputy Rural and Regional Development Minister until 2006 before he was appointed Deputy Finance Minister until April 2013.

While in the general election of 2008, he competed in two seats for Parliament and state assemblies but was defeated in both seat.

On April 9, 2009, he was appointed senator and was reappointed for a second term on April 9, 2012.

Datuk Dr. Awang Adek bin Hussin is no longer an active politician he once was. He had relinquished all his party positions after the General Election in 2018. He remains active as an ordinary party member and is no longer active in party politics. Since 2018, his involvements focused mainly on corporate activities and has been chairmen on a few boards.

Cabinet positions
 Deputy Rural and Regional Development Minister (2004–2006)
 Deputy Finance Minister (2006–2013) 
 Senator (2011-2013)

Ambassador to the United States 2014-2016
On 31 March 2014, he was appointed the new ambassador to the United States by Yang di-Pertuan Agong Tuanku Abdul Halim Mu'adzam Shah.

Election results

Honours
  :
  Companion of the Order of Loyalty to the Crown of Malaysia (JSM) (1999)
  :
  Knight Commander of the Order of the Life of the Crown of Kelantan (DJMK) – Dato' (2003)
  Knight Commander of the Order of the Crown of Kelantan (DPMK) – Dato' (2006)
  :
  Grand Knight of the Order of the Crown of Pahang (SIMP) - formerly Dato', now Dato' Indera (2003)
  :
  Companion Class I of the Exalted Order of Malacca (DMSM) – Datuk (1999)
  Knight Commander of the Order of Malacca (DCSM) – Datuk Wira (2007)
 :
 Knight Grand Commander of the Order of the Crown of Perlis (SPMP) – Dato' Seri (2022)
  :
  Commander of the Order of the Defender of State (DGPN) – Dato' Seri (2022)

See also

 Perupok (state constituency) (renamed Pantai Irama) 
 Bachok (federal constituency)

References

1956 births
Living people
People from Kelantan
Malaysian people of Malay descent
Malaysian Muslims
United Malays National Organisation politicians
Members of the Dewan Rakyat
Members of the Dewan Negara
Drew University alumni
Wharton School of the University of Pennsylvania alumni
Ambassadors of Malaysia to the United States
Malaysian expatriates in the United States
Companions of the Order of Loyalty to the Crown of Malaysia